Chamtar Khan may refer to:
 Chamtar Khan-e Olya
 Chamtar Khan-e Sofla